"Trigger Happy Jack" is a single from the debut album of Poe. The single peaked at 17 on the alternative charts and earned a gold record. The video was quite popular featuring Matt Sorum from Guns N' Roses on drums, co-writer Jeffrey Connor on bass and featured Poe harassing a small man that she keeps in a jar.

Tracks
 Psycho Demolition Mix 7:50
 Only Poe Mix 3:35
 Drive By Remix 3:46
 Instrumental 3:47
 Original Album Version 3:35
 Padre Fear 3:25
 Acoustic Version 3:40
 Radio Edit 3:47

Charts
Billboard (United States)

Poe (singer) songs
1996 singles
1995 songs
Atlantic Records singles
Songs about fictional male characters